Cosmo Landesman (born September 1954) is a British-based American-born journalist and editor. With his then-wife Julie Burchill and friend Toby Young, he founded the magazine Modern Review, which operated from 1991 to 1995 with Young as editor.

Early life 
Cosmo Landesman is the older of two sons of Fran and Jay Landesman, a lyricist and poet and a writer and publisher, from New York and St. Louis, respectively. He and his younger brother Miles Davis Landesman were born in St. Louis. Their parents worked in music and theatre. The family emigrated to London in 1964. By 1967, they embraced hippie culture, wearing beads and long hair. While Cosmo studied books more deeply, Miles became footloose, leaving their secondary school. Always more bookish, Cosmo envied his younger brother's willingness to plunge into the world; he left school in London at age 16 and experimented with the fringes of performance.

In 2008, by then a journalist for several decades, Landesman's memoir Starstruck was published. The book largely concerns growing up with his theatrical parents, described by Geordie Greig as "two wacky, middle-aged American egotists who arrived in 'the land of the stiff upper lip' and caused mayhem. Blind to their own blush-making toxicity, they were obsessed with being famous." Landesman also came to terms with his parents, who viewed themselves as appropriate subjects for his book.

Career

The Modern Review
With his then wife, Julie Burchill, he became friends with Toby Young, a writer and editor. The three collaborated on founding The Modern Review in 1991, in which they intended to cover low-brow culture for the high-brows.

The founders argued how to proceed when circulation fell. Landesman and Burchill separated after she had an affair with Charlotte Raven, who was then an intern at The Modern Review. Landesman quit the UK in 1995 for New York City. He was one of the contributors to Vanity Fair's Cool Britannia issue in March 1997. He was a dating columnist for The Sunday Times.

Article in The Spectator
In April 2022, an article by Landesman in The Spectator, arguing for a right to "stare at women", was criticised by British Transport Police. His article was in response to a poster campaign which warned against 'intrusive staring'. Dawn Butler MP criticised the magazine for publishing the "creepy and misogynistic" article.

Personal life
As a young man, he joined the Groucho Club. He married Julie Burchill. Their son, Jack, took his own life in June 2015, aged 29, after suffering depression for many years.

Bibliography

Books

Articles

Critical studies and reviews of Landesman's work
Starstruck

References

1954 births
Living people
British film critics
British Jews
The Spectator people
Writers from St. Louis
British journalists
The Sunday Times people